is a public transportation company based in Gifu, Gifu Prefecture, Japan. It is a subsidiary of Nagoya Railroad and primarily operates within Gifu Prefecture. Some of its public transportation routes within the city of Gifu were handed over by Meitetsu Bus on October 1, 2004. On April 1, 2005, it also received the public bus routes run by the city. At the same time, it also replaced bus lines in nearby cities and began operating the Gifu Community Bus.

Branch offices
Gifu Bus operates 11 offices in the area, three of which are located within the city of Gifu. The other locations within Gifu Prefecture include Yamagata, Mino, Seki, Gujō, Kakamigahara and Ginan. The final location is in neighboring Aichi Prefecture's Nishiharu.

Drivers' nameplates indicate the branch to which they belong, so some nameplates indicate branch offices that have been closed, moved or merged and are not included in the list above.

Fares
Gifu Bus' local routes are divided into regions and fares vary based on the distance traveled between the boarding and unboarding locations. The base fare is 200 yen, though reduced fares are available for children and the elderly. Riders can take a numbered ticket when boarding the bus, with their fare indicated on a board at the front of the bus as they get off.

Until March 31, 2007, riders were able to use prepaid fare cards to pay for their fare. These cards were available in various denominations and offered riders a bonus of 5–15%, depending on the denomination purchased. These prepaid cards were replaced by the Ayuca smart cards, which first went on sale on December 1, 2006. Like the prepaid cards, these smart cards replaced cash and gave bonuses to riders when they recharged their cards. Both systems were used simultaneously for four months until the prepaid cards were stopped.

Vehicles

The majority of the buses in use were made by Mitsubishi Fuso Truck and Bus Corporation, because those were the buses used by Nagoya Railroad when the routes began. However, the buses run by Gifu were models made by either Isuzu or Nissan Diesel, so there is some variety among bus types. Additionally, some buses were purchased from Kawasaki Heavy Industries many years ago; these buses have been refurbished and are still in use.

In 2005, Gifu Bus began using non-step buses from Hino Motors to accommodate the aging population of the area. The company also uses hybrid buses made by Mitsubishi that were first used in Expo 2005 in neighboring Aichi Prefecture; most of these buses are operated by the Yanagase Branch Office. Hino Motors provided the hybrid buses used exclusively on the Shinai Loop Line.

The sightseeing and highway buses generally use Mitsubishi buses, but there are also a few made by Mercedes-Benz. Some of the larger model buses were built by the Belgian company Van Hool.

Routes
The company's bus routes are listed below, separated by the branch office which manages them. (Note: Not all branch offices run bus lines.)

Gifu Branch Office
Gifu City Loop Line
Sagiyama Kenchō Line
Shōrai Kanō Line
Chūsetsu Nagara Line
Ginanchō Line
Kidaijidanchi Line
Iwado Irifune Line
Malera Chūsetsu Line
Aeon Kakamigahara Line
Yana Bus
Ii Bus (Community Bus)
Gifu West Branch Office
Akanabe Mitahora Line
Obusa Sunomata Line
Gifu Shōtoku Gakuendai Line
Kagashima Ichihashi Line
Mieji Hozumi Line
Hozumi Rio-World Line
Kitagata Hozumi Line

Kakigase Branch Office
Kurono Line
Gifu Daigaku, Byōin Line
<Branch of Gifu Daigaku, Byōin Line>
Motosu Line
Ijira Line
Kakebora Hōju Line
Kanō Shima Line
Kanō Minami Line
Sogaya Line
Kitagata Enkyōji Line
Saigō Line
Masada Chūsetsu Line
Ōno Shinsei Kitagata Line
Gifu Kōsen Line
Ōno Kitakō Line
Kenchō Gidai line
Kagashimaōhashi Line
Ōno Hozumi Line
Mino Branch Office
Kano Danchi Line
Takami Line
Makitani Line
Horado Seki Line
Nagoya Line H
Takaoka Himi Line H

Takatomi Branch Office
Gifu Takatomi Line
Gihoku Line
Itadori Line
Gifu Joshidai Line
Mitahora Line
Seki Branch Office
Gifu Kaminoho Line
Seki Mugi Line
Takano Line
Horado Seki Line
Seki Unuma Line
Hachiman Branch Office
(Gifu Bus Community Hachiman Co., Ltd.)
Hachiman Line
Wara Line
Meihō Line
Shōkawa Hachiman Line
Hachiman Line H
Shirakawa-gō H
Hachiman Nagoya Line H

Kakamigahara Branch Office
(Gifu Bus Community Co., Ltd.)
Ōbora Danchi Line
Ozaki Danchi Line
Senbiki Taiheidai Town Line
Kawashima Maewatari　Line
Hino Ichihashi Line
Kurachi Line
Gifu Kakamigahara Line
Kakamigahara Tōbu Line
VR Techno Line
Unuma Ryokuen Danchi Line
Little World Line
Meiji-mura Line
Chōja-machi Danchi Junkan Line

HIndicates highway lines

Designations
Each route listed above (other than the Gifu City Loop Line, the Yana Bus, the Community Bus, the School bus as Ōno Kitakō and Kagashima Ōhashi Line, and the Highway Lines) are designated with both a letter and a two-digit number. All routes run through Meitetsu Gifu Station along eight main trunks, so each line is divided into one of eight groups. The numbering indicates how far from Meitetsu Gifu Station the final destination is (e.g. a bus numbered "80" would travel further than a bus numbered "50"). The eight letters and their respective areas are listed below.

N: for/from Nagara Bridge Avenue (ex. North/Northwest of Gifu City) Area
K: for/from Kinka Bridge Avenue (ex. North/Northwest of Gifu City)  Area
C: for/from Chūsetsu Bridge Avenue (ex. Gifu Univ., Kurono) Area
O: for/from Ōnawaba Bridge Avenue (ex. Kitagata, Ōno) Area

G: for/from Gōdo Bridge Avenue (ex. Kagashima, Mizuho City)  Area
W: for/from West Kanō (ex. Kanō Shinhonmachi, Sunomata) area
E: for/from East Kanō (ex. Kanō Sakuramichi, Pref. Office, Yanaizu) area
B: for/from Bairin Park (ex. Kitaishiki) area

Late night routes
Three of the routes have a few buses that run beyond normal operating hours, allowing commuters and other people to catch a late bus home. The charge for these buses is twice the normal fare and they do not run on Saturdays, Sundays or holidays.
Kurono Line (Kakigase Branch Office)
Takatomi Line (Takatomi Branch Office)
Ōbora Danchi Line (Kakamigahara Branch Office)

School routes
Gifu Bus operates shuttle buses to two local universities—Asahi University and Gifu University. The route to Asahi University is jointly operated by the Gifu, Gifu West and Kakigase branch offices. The Gifu University route is part of the Kenchō Gidai Line and is run by the Kakigase Branch Office.

References

External links

Gifu Bus Co. homepage 

Bus companies of Japan
Transport in Gifu Prefecture